Robyn Mary McSweeney (born 9 October 1957) is an Australian politician. She was a Liberal member of the Western Australian Legislative Council from 2001 to 2017, representing the region of South West.

McSweeney was born in Bridgetown, Western Australia. She was educated at Bridgetown and Manjimup high schools, and divides her time between living in Bridgetown and living in Perth. McSweeney was the Minister for Child Protection, Community Services, and Seniors and Volunteering, having held these portfolios as shadow minister prior to the Coalition's election in 2008.

References

External links
 WA Parliament profile

1957 births
Living people
Members of the Western Australian Legislative Council
Liberal Party of Australia members of the Parliament of Western Australia
People from Bridgetown, Western Australia
21st-century Australian politicians
21st-century Australian women politicians
Women members of the Western Australian Legislative Council